Gammersgill is a hamlet in Coverdale in the Yorkshire Dales, North Yorkshire, England.

The toponym is of Old Norse origin, from Gamall, a personal name, and skali 'hut', so means 'hut of a man named Gamel'.

References

External links

Villages in North Yorkshire
Coverdale (dale)